The Kurchatov Medal, or the Gold Medal in honour of Igor Kurchatov is an award given for outstanding achievements in nuclear physics and in the field of nuclear energy. The USSR Academy of Sciences established this award on February 9, 1960 in honour of Igor Kurchatov and in recognition of his lifetime contributions to the fields of nuclear physics, nuclear energy and nuclear engineering.

In the USSR,  the Kurchatov Medal award was given every three years starting in 1962.  Honorarium was included as part of the award through 1989. Later in Russia, the Kurchatov Gold Medal award has been resumed, and the medal has been given since 1998.

Soviet award recipients
Source: Russian Academy of Sciences
1962: Pyotr Spivak and Yuri Prokoviev 
1965: Yuriy Prokoshkin, Vladimir Rykalin, Valentin Petruhin and Anatoly Danubians
1968: Anatoly Aleksandrov
1971: Isaak Kikoin
1974: Julii Khariton and Savely Moiseevich Feinberg
1977: Yakov Zeldovich and 
1980: Isai Izrailevich Gurevich and Boris Nikolsky
1981: William d'Haeseleer
1983: Vladimir Mostovoy
1986: Venedikt Dzhelepov and Leonid Ponomarev
1989: Georgy Flyorov and Yuri Oganessian

Russian awards
1998: Aleksey Ogloblin
2000: Nikolay Dollezhal 
2003: Yuri Trutnev
2008: Oleg Gennadievich Filatov
2013: Yevgeny Avrorin
2018: Nikolay Evgenievich Kukharkin

See also
 Awards and decorations of the Russian Federation
 Medal "For Merit in the Development of Nuclear Energy"
 List of physics awards

External links
 Kurchatov Gold Medal. The Russian Academy of Sciences official listing

Orders, decorations, and medals of the Soviet Union
Nuclear physics
Physics awards
Awards established in 1960
Orders, decorations, and medals of Russia
1960 establishments in the Soviet Union
Nuclear history of the Soviet Union
Awards of the Russian Academy of Sciences
Nuclear energy in Russia
USSR Academy of Sciences